Flesh and Blood (alternately Flesh & Blood) may refer to:

Flesh & Blood (card game), a collectible card game released in 2019

Religion
the Christian sacrament of the Eucharist
flesh and blood, an expression of the church father Justin Martyr

Books 
Flesh and Blood, a 1920 work by François Mauriac
Flesh and Blood (Kellerman novel), a 2001 novel by American author Jonathan Kellerman
Flesh and Blood, a 2004 novel by Australian author Jackie French. It is also known as Blood Will Tell.
Flesh & Blood, a 1994 novel by Graham Masterton
Flesh and Blood, a novel by American author Pete Hamill
Flesh and Blood (John Harvey novel), a novel by British author John Harvey
Flesh and Blood, a historical survey by Scottish author Reay Tannahill
Flesh and Blood, a novel by Michael Cunningham

Film and television

Film
Flesh and Blood (1922 film), a film starring Lon Chaney, Sr.
Flesh and Blood (1951 film), a 1951 British film with George Cole
Flesh and Blood (1968 film), a 1968 television film directed by Arthur Penn
Flesh and Blood (1985 film), a 1985 action/adventure film directed by Paul Verhoeven
Flesh & Blood, a 1996 gay pornographic film directed by Jerry Douglas
Flesh and Blood (2017 film), a 2017 American drama film directed by Mark Webber

TV
Flesh and Blood (TV series), a 2020 British drama in four episodes that was broadcast on ITV
Flesh 'n' Blood (TV series), a 1991 American sitcom that aired on NBC
"Flesh and Blood" (Stargate SG-1), an episode of the TV series Stargate SG-1
"Flesh and Blood" (Star Trek: Voyager), an episode of the TV series Star Trek: Voyager
"Flesh & Blood" (The Unit), an episode of the television series The Unit
 "Flesh & Blood" (Into the Dark), an episode of the first season of Into the Dark
"Flesh and Blood" (Person of Interest), an episode of the American television drama series Person of Interest
Flesh and Blood, a 2020 episode of Masterpiece Mystery!
My Flesh and Blood, a 2003 documentary about the Tom Family, directed by Jonathan Karsh

Music 
Flesh and Blood, a Portland, Oregon based band fronted by Billy Rancher

Albums
Flesh and Blood (Jimmy Barnes album), or the title track, 2021
Flesh and Blood (Mike Peters album)
Flesh and Blood (No Innocent Victim album), 1999
Flesh and Blood (Roxy Music album)
Flesh & Blood (John Butler Trio album)
Flesh & Blood (Poison album), 1990
Flesh & Blood (Whitesnake album), 2019

Songs
"Flesh and Blood" (song), by Johnny Cash, 1970
"Flesh & Blood" (song), by the Invictus Games Choir and Gareth Malone
"Flesh and Blood", by Wilson Phillips from Shadows and Light 
"Flesh and Blood", by Solomon Burke from Don't Give Up on Me
"Flesh and Blood", by Imelda May from Life Love Flesh Blood
"Flesh and Blood", by Reveille from Laced
"Flesh 'n Blood", by Oingo Boingo written for the film Ghostbusters II